Cantiones sacrae or Sacrae cantiones (Latin for "Sacred songs") may refer to:

Sacrae cantiones for four, five, six or more voices, 1573 works by Alexander Utendal
Cantiones quae ab argumento sacrae vocantur, a 1575 collection by William Byrd and Thomas Tallis
Cantiones sacrae, 1589 and 1591 works by William Byrd
Sacrae cantiones liber primus, 1592 works by Tiburtio Massaino
Cantiones sacrae (Gesualdo), two collections of motets of Carlo Gesualdo da Venosa published in 1603
Sacrae cantiones, 1614 works by Vincenzo Ugolini
Cantiones sacrae (Schütz), a 1625 collection of forty different pieces of vocal sacred music by Heinrich Schütz
 Sacred Songs, a 1980 album by Daryl Hall